The Vancouver Film Critics Circle Award for Best Canadian Documentary Film is an annual award, presented by the Vancouver Film Critics Circle to the film judged by its members as the best Canadian documentary film of the year. It is separate from the Vancouver Film Critics Circle Award for Best Documentary, presented to international documentary films.

Winners and nominees

2010s

2020s

References

Vancouver Film Critics Circle Awards
Canadian documentary film awards